APN may refer to:

Biology and chemistry
 3-Arylpropiolonitriles, a class of chemical reagents 
 Acute pyelonephritis, a urinary tract infection
 Acyl peroxy nitrates, respiratory and eye irritants in photochemical smog

Computing
 Access Point Name, a gateway between mobile networks and frequently the Internet
 Application-Layer Protocol Negotiation
 Algebraic Petri net, a kind of Petri net in computer science
 Amazon Partner Network, for Amazon Web Services

Journalism
 APN News & Media, an Australian and New Zealand media company
 Animal Planet (Australia and New Zealand), a television channel
 Novosti Press Agency (Agentstvo pechati Novosti), a Soviet news agency operating 1961–1990

Organizations
 African Parks Network, a private park management institution
 Alberta Playwrights Network, a professional association in Canada
 Americans for Peace Now, a group associated with the Israeli Peace Now movement
 Asia-Pacific Network for Global Change Research, in Kobe, Japan

Other
 Americanist phonetic notation, a system for phonetic transcription
 Advanced practice nurse, a nurse with post-graduate education in nursing
 Alpena County Regional Airport (IATA airport code) in Michigan
 Assessor's parcel number, to identify real property